Events from the year 1693 in the Kingdom of Scotland.

Incumbents 
 Monarch – William II and Mary II
 Secretary of State – John Dalrymple, Master of Stair, jointly with James Johnston

Law officers 
 Lord Advocate – Sir James Stewart
 Solicitor General for Scotland – ??

Judiciary 
 Lord President of the Court of Session – Lord Stair
 Lord Justice General – Lord Lothian
 Lord Justice Clerk – Lord Ormiston

Events 
 14 June – Parliament turns its attention to an 'Act for Encouraging of Forraigne Trade' – that would lead to the Darien Scheme
 Start of the "seven ill years" of famine in Scotland

Births 
date unknown –
 John Campbell, 4th Duke of Argyll, soldier and Member of Parliament (died 1770)

Deaths 
 9 April – Walter Scott, Earl of Tarras, nobleman (born 1644)
 15 May – John Hamilton, 2nd Lord Bargany, peer (born c.1640)
date unknown
 Alexander Fraser, 11th Lord Saltoun, peer (born 1604)
 George Munro, 1st of Newmore, soldier and member of parliament 1602)

See also 
 Timeline of Scottish history

References 

 
Years of the 17th century in Scotland
1690s in Scotland